Stuart Gordon McFarlane  (4 May 1885 – 31 December 1970) was a senior Australian public servant. He was Secretary of the Department of the Treasury between 1938 and 1949.

Life and career
Stuart McFarlane was born at Maldon, Victoria on 4 May 1885.

McFarlane began his career in the Commonwealth public service as
a clerk in the Finance Branch of the Department of the Treasury in 1903. Between 1911 and 1926, he worked in the Postmaster-General's Department.

He went on to serve as Assistant Secretary of the Finance Branch between 1926 and 1932, and then Assistant Secretary in the Administration Branch.

He was appointed Secretary of the Treasury in March 1938.

During his time in the public service, McFarlane travelled quite extensively, including to India, Papua New Guinea and England.

Awards
In 1933, McFarlane was made a Companion of the Order of St Michael and St George.

References

1885 births
1970 deaths
Australian Companions of the Order of St Michael and St George
Secretaries of the Department of the Treasury of Australia
People from Maldon, Victoria